Fabián Alejandro Carmona Fredes (born 21 March 1994) is a Chilean footballer who plays as an attacking midfielder in Coquimbo Unido.

Career
He debuted on 9 September 2012 in a match against Santiago Wanderers for the 2012 Copa Chile, scoring the first goal of the match. He played his first league match on 29 September in a match against Unión La Calera

Career statistics

Club

References

External links
 

1994 births
Living people
Footballers from Santiago
Chilean footballers
Universidad de Chile footballers
Club Deportivo Palestino footballers
Deportes La Serena footballers
Deportes Santa Cruz footballers
Audax Italiano footballers
Coquimbo Unido footballers
Chilean Primera División players
Primera B de Chile players
Association football midfielders